The Kajuk language, Ekajuk (also spelled Akajo and Akajuk), is an Ekoid language (of the Niger–Congo family) spoken in the Cross River State and some surrounding regions of Nigeria.

The Ekajuk are one of several peoples who use the nsibidi ideographs.

References

External links
Sample paragraph in Ekajuk
Ekajuk basic lexicon at the Global Lexicostatistical Database

Ekoid languages
Languages of Nigeria